Monica Lundqvist (born 18 April 1967) is a Swedish former professional tennis player.

Biography
Lundqvist, who comes from Sundsvall, reached a best singles ranking of 143 in the world.

Her best performances on the WTA Tour came in 1986, when she made the round of 16 at the Taipei Women's Championships and Singapore Open, beating a young Arantxa Sánchez Vicario in the former.

She appeared in two Federation Cup ties for Sweden, against France and Belgium, both in 1986.

ITF finals

Singles (0-1)

Doubles (1-2)

See also
List of Sweden Fed Cup team representatives

References

External links
 
 
 

1967 births
Living people
Swedish female tennis players
People from Sundsvall
Sportspeople from Västernorrland County
20th-century Swedish women
21st-century Swedish women